Philippines did not play any friendlies in 2020 due to the COVID-19 pandemic. On 19 February 2021, FIFA and AFC confirmed the dates for the remaining matches of the World Cup qualifiers held in June. The team was supposed to play a friendly against India in Qatar as part of the preparation for the qualifiers, but it was cancelled.

2021

2022

2023

References

External links
 Philippine Football Federation
 Philippines at FIFA.com
 Philippines – World football elo ratings at ELOratings.net 
 
 
 

2020
National football team results
2020s in Philippine sport